DNA paternity testing is the use of DNA profiles to determine whether an individual is the biological parent of another individual. Paternity testing can be especially important when the rights and duties of the father are in issue and a child's paternity is in doubt. Tests can also determine the likelihood of someone being a biological grandparent. Though genetic testing is the most reliable standard, older methods also exist, including ABO blood group typing, analysis of various other proteins and enzymes, or using human leukocyte antigen antigens. The current techniques for paternity testing are using polymerase chain reaction (PCR) and restriction fragment length polymorphism (RFLP). Paternity testing can now also be performed while the woman is still pregnant from a blood draw.

DNA testing is currently the most advanced and accurate technology to determine parentage. In a DNA paternity test, the result (called the 'probability of parentage) is 0% when the alleged parent is not biologically related to the child, and the probability of parentage is typically 99.99% when the alleged parent is biologically related to the child. However, while almost all individuals have a single and distinct set of genes, rare individuals, known as "chimeras", have at least two different sets of genes, which can result in a false negative result if their reproductive tissue has a different genetic make-up from the tissue sampled for the test.

Paternity or maternity testing for child or adult
The DNA test is performed by collecting buccal (cheek) cells found on the inside of a person's cheek using a buccal or cheek swab. These swabs have wooden or plastic stick handles with a cotton on synthetic tip. The collector rubs the inside of a person's cheek to collect as many buccal cells as possible, which are then sent to a laboratory for testing. Samples from the alleged father or mother and the child would be needed.

Prenatal paternity testing for unborn child

Invasive prenatal paternity testing
It is possible to determine who the biological father of the fetus is while the woman is still pregnant through procedures called chorionic villus sampling or amniocentesis. Chorionic villus sampling retrieves placental tissue in either a transcervical or transabdominal manner. Amniocentesis retrieves amniotic fluid by inserting a needle through the pregnant mother's abdominal wall. These procedures are highly accurate because they are taking a sample directly from the fetus; however, there is a small risk for the woman to miscarry and lose the pregnancy as a result. Both CVS and Amnio require the pregnant woman to visit a genetic specialist known as a maternal-fetal medicine specialist who will perform the procedure.

Non-invasive prenatal paternity testing
Advances in genetic testing have led to the ability to identify the biological father while the woman is still pregnant. There is a small amount of fetal DNA (cffDNA) present in the mother's blood during pregnancy. This allows for accurate fetal DNA paternity testing during pregnancy from a blood draw with no risk of miscarriage. Studies have shown that cffDNA can first be observed as early as 7 weeks gestation, and the amount of cffDNA increases as the pregnancy progresses.

DNA profiling

The DNA of an individual is the same in every somatic (nonreproductive) cell. Sexual reproduction brings the DNA of both parents together to create a unique combination of genetic material in a new cell, so the genetic material of an individual is derived from the genetic material of each parent in equal amounts; this genetic material is known as the nuclear genome of the individual, because it is found in the nucleus.

Comparing the DNA sequence of one person to that of another can prove if one of them was derived from the other, but DNA paternity tests are not currently 100% accurate. Specific sequences are examined to see if they were copied verbatim from one individual's genome; if so, then the genetic material of one individual could have been derived from that of the other (i.e. one is the parent of the other). This is called Autosomal DNA testing. It is currently the gold standard in paternity testing as it allows a comparison of the child’s DNA to that of the mother and alleged father. The genetic contribution to the child from the mother can be evaluated, resulting in possible genotypes for the true father. If the alleged father cannot be excluded as the true father, then statistical calculations can be conducted to determine how likely the alleged father is the true father compared to if another random man was the true father.

Besides nuclear DNA, mitochondria also have their own genetic material called mitochondrial DNA. Mitochondrial DNA comes only from the mother, without any shuffling. Proving a relationship based on comparison of the mitochondrial genome is much easier than that based on the nuclear genome. However, testing the mitochondrial genome can prove only if two individuals are related by common descent through maternal lines only from a common ancestor and is, thus, of limited value (i.e., it could not be used to test for paternity).

In testing the paternity of a male child, comparison of the Y chromosome can be used, since it is passed directly from father to son. However, similar to mitochondrial DNA, the Y chromosome is passed through the paternal line. Meaning two brothers share the Y chromosome of their father. Therefore if one brother is the suspected father, his biological brother could also be the father based on Y chromosomal data alone. This is true with any male related to the suspected father on the paternal line. For this reason autosomal DNA testing would be a more precise paternity testing method. 

In the US, the AABB has regulations for DNA paternity and family relationship testing, but AABB accreditation is not required. DNA test results are legally admissible if the collection and the processing follows a chain of custody. Similarly in Canada, the SCC has regulations on DNA paternity and relationship testing, but this accreditation, while recommended, is not required.

The Paternity Testing Commission of the International Society for Forensic Genetics has taken up the task of establishing the biostatistical recommendations in accordance with the ISO/IEC 17025 standards. Bio-statistical evaluations of paternity should be based on a likelihood ratio principle - yielding the Paternity Index, PI. The recommendations provide guidance on concepts of genetic hypotheses and calculation concerns needed to produce valid PIs, as well as on specific issues related to population genetics.

History
The first form of any kind of parental testing was blood typing, or matching blood types between the child and alleged parent, which became available in the 1920s, after scientists recognized that blood types, which had been discovered in the early 1900s, were genetically inherited. Under this form of testing, the blood types of the child and parents are compared, and it can be determined whether there is any possibility of a parental link. For example, two O blood type parents can produce a child only with an O blood type, and two parents with a B blood type can produce a child with either a B or an O blood type. This often led to inconclusive results, as 30% of the entire population can be excluded from being the possible parent under this form of testing. In the 1930s, serological testing, which tests certain proteins in the blood, became available, with a 40% exclusion rate.

In the 1960s, accurate genetic paternity testing became a possibility when HLA typing was developed, which compares the genetic fingerprints on white blood cells between the child and alleged parent. HLA tests could be done with 80% accuracy but could not distinguish between close relatives. Genetic parental testing technology advanced further with the isolation of the first restriction enzyme in 1970. Highly accurate DNA parental testing became available in the 1980s with the development of RFLP. In the 1990s, PCR became the standard method for DNA parental testing: a simpler, faster, and more accurate method of testing than RFLP, it has an exclusion rate of 99.99% or higher.

Legal evidence
The DNA parentage test that follows strict chain of custody can generate legally admissible results that are used for child support, inheritance, social welfare benefits, immigration, or adoption purposes. To satisfy the chain-of-custody legal requirements, all tested parties have to be properly identified and their specimens collected by a third-party professional who is not related to any of the tested parties and has no interest in the outcome of the test.

The quantum of evidence needed is clear and convincing evidence: that is, more evidence than an ordinary case in civil litigation, but less than beyond a reasonable doubt required to convict a defendant in a criminal case.

In recent years, immigration authorities in various countries, such as the United States, United Kingdom, Canada, Australia, France, and others, may accept DNA parentage test results from immigration petitioners and beneficiaries in a family-based immigration case when primary documents that prove biological relationship are missing or inadequate.

In the U.S., immigration applicants bear the responsibility of arranging and paying for DNA testing. The U.S. immigration authorities require that the DNA test, if pursued, be performed by one of the laboratories accredited by the AABB (formerly American Association of Blood Banks). Similarly, in Canada, the laboratory needs to be accredited by the Standards Council of Canada.

Although paternity tests are more common than maternity tests, there may be circumstances in which the biological mother of the child is unclear: examples include cases of an adopted child attempting to reunify with his or her biological mother, potential hospital mix-ups, and in vitro fertilization where the laboratory may have implanted an unrelated embryo inside the mother.

Other factors, such as new laws regarding reproductive technologies using donated eggs and sperm and surrogate mothers, can also mean that the female giving birth is not necessarily the legal mother of the child. For example, in Canada, the federal Human Assisted Reproduction Act provides for the use of hired surrogate mothers. The legal mother of the child may be the egg donor. Similar laws are in place in the United Kingdom and Australia.

In Brazil in 2019, two male identical twins were ordered to both pay maintenance for a child fathered by one of them, because the father could not be identified with DNA.

Legal issues

Australia
Peace-of-mind parentage tests are widely available on the internet. For a parentage test (paternity or maternity) to be admissible for legal purposes, such as for changing a birth certificate, Family Law Court proceedings, visa/citizenship applications or child support claims, the process must comply with the Family Law Regulations 1984 (Cth). Further, the laboratory processing the samples must be accredited by the National Association of Testing Authorities (NATA).

Canada
Personal paternity-testing kits are available. The Standards Council of Canada regulates paternity testing in Canada whereby laboratories are ISO 17025-approved. In Canada, only a handful of labs have this approval, and it is recommended that testing is performed in these labs. Courts also have the power to order paternity tests during divorce cases.

China
In China, paternity testing is legally available to fathers who suspect their child is not theirs. Chinese law also requires a paternity test for any child born outside the one-child policy for the child to be eligible for a hukou, or family registration record. Family tie formed by adoption can also only be confirmed by a paternity test. A large number of Chinese citizens seek paternity testing each year, and this has given rise to many unlicensed illegal testing centers being set up.

France
DNA paternity testing is solely performed on decision of a judge in case of a judiciary procedure in order either to establish or contest paternity or to obtain or deny child support. Private DNA paternity testing is illegal, including through laboratories in other countries, and is punishable by up to a year in prison and a €15,000 fine. The French Council of State has described the law's purpose as upholding the "French regime of filiation" and preserving "the peace of families."

Germany
Under the Gene Diagnostics Act of 2009, secret paternity testing is illegal. Any paternity testing must be conducted by a licensed physician or by an expert with a university degree in science and special education in parentage testing, and the laboratory carrying out genetic testing must be accredited according to ISO/IEC 17025. Full informed consent of both parents is required, and prenatal paternity testing is prohibited, with the exception of sexual abuse and rape cases. Any genetic testing done without the other parent's consent is punishable with a €5,000 fine. Due to an amendment of the civil law section 1598a in 2005, any man who contests paternity no longer automatically severs legal rights and obligations to the child.

Israel
A paternity test with any legal standing must be ordered by a family court. Though parents have access to "peace of mind" parental tests through overseas laboratories, family courts are under no obligation to accept them as evidence. It is also illegal to take genetic material for a parental test from a minor over 16 years of age without the minor's consent. Family courts have the power to order paternity tests against the will of the father in divorce and child support cases, as well as in other cases such as determining heirs and settling the question involving the population registry. A man seeking to prove that he is not the father of the child registered as his is entitled to a paternity test, even if the mother and natural guardian object. Paternity tests are not ordered when it is believed it could lead to the murder of the mother, and until 2007, were not ordered when there was a chance that the child of a married woman could have been fathered by a man other than her husband, thereby making the child a mamzer under Jewish law.

Philippines
DNA paternity testing for personal knowledge is legal, and home test kits are available by mail from representatives of AABB- and ISO 17025-certified laboratories. DNA Paternity Testing for official purposes, such as sustento (child support) and inheritance disputes, must follow the Rule on DNA Evidence A.M. No. 06-11-5-SC, which was promulgated by the Philippine Supreme Court on October 15, 2007. Tests are sometimes ordered by courts when proof of paternity is required.

Spain
In Spain, peace-of-mind paternity tests are a "big business," partly due to the French ban on paternity testing, with many genetic testing companies being based in Spain.

United Kingdom
In the United Kingdom, there were no restrictions on paternity tests until the Human Tissue Act 2004 came into force in September 2006. Section 45 states that it is an offence to possess without appropriate consent any human bodily material with the intent of analysing its DNA. Legally declared fathers have access to paternity-testing services under the new regulations, provided the putative parental DNA being tested is their own. Tests are sometimes ordered by courts when proof of paternity is required. In the UK, the Ministry of Justice accredits bodies that can conduct this testing. The Department of Health produced a voluntary code of practice on genetic paternity testing in 2001. This document is currently under review, and responsibility for it has been transferred to the Human Tissue Authority.
In the 2018 case of Anderson V Spencer the Court of Appeal permitted for the very first time DNA samples taken from a Deceased person to be used for paternity testing.

United States
In the United States, paternity testing is fully legal, and fathers may test their children without the consent or knowledge of the mother. Paternity testing take-home kits are readily available for purchase, though their results are not admissible in court and are for personal knowledge only.

Only a court-ordered paternity test may be used as evidence in court proceedings. If parental testing is being submitted for legal purposes, including immigration, testing must be ordered through a lab that has AABB accreditation for relationship DNA testing.

The legal implications of a parentage result test vary by state and according to whether the putative parents are unmarried or married. If a parentage test does not meet forensic standards for the state in question, a court-ordered test may be required for the results of the test to be admissible for legal purposes. For unmarried parents, if a parent is currently receiving child support or custody, but DNA testing later proves that the man is not the father, support automatically stops. However, in many states, this testing must be performed during a narrow window of time, if a voluntary acknowledgement of parentage form has already been signed by the putative father; otherwise, the results of the test may be disregarded by law, and in many cases, a man may be required to pay child support, though the child is biologically unrelated. In a few states, if the mother is receiving the support, then that alleged father has the right to file a lawsuit to get back any money that he lost from paying support. As of 2011, in most states, unwed parents confronted with a voluntary acknowledgement of parentage form are informed of the possibility and right to request a DNA paternity test. If testing is refused by the mother, the father may not be required to sign the birth certificate or the voluntary acknowledgement of parentage form for the child. For wedded putative parents, the husband of the mother is presumed to be the father of the child. But, in most states, this presumption can be overturned by the application of a forensic paternity test; in many states, the time for overturning this presumption may be limited to the first few years of the child's life.

See also
 Paternity fraud
 Mosaicism and chimerism, rare genetic conditions that can result in false negative results on DNA-based tests
 Non-paternity event
 Lauren Lake's Paternity Court, a television series that debuted in fall 2013

Genetic:
 Heritability
 List of Mendelian traits in humans

References

External links
 UK paternity testing regulations per the Human Tissue Authority

Applied genetics
DNA
Family law
Fathers' rights
Forensic genetics
Genetics techniques
Parenting
Testing